Melting Me Softly is a 2019 South Korean television series starring Ji Chang-wook, Won Jin-ah, and Yoon Se-ah. Created by Studio Dragon and produced by writer Baek Mi-kyung's own company Story Phoenix, it aired on tvN every Saturday and Sunday at 21:00 (KST) from September 28 to November 17, 2019 for 16 episodes.

Synopsis
Ma Dong-chan (Ji Chang-wook) and Ko Mi-ran (Won Jin-ah) take part in a 24-hour experiment where both are frozen. Things don't go as expected and they wake up from the frozen capsule 20 years later instead of 24 hours. In order to survive the side effects of their cryogenic sleep, they must follow a set of restrictions to maintain their body temperature at 31.5 °C (max. 33 °C/88-91 °F) and keep their heart rate normal. The scientist behind the experiment is the only one who knows the key to their survival but he has lost his memory after an accident. Racing against time, the story focuses on two dynamic individuals' attempt to resume normalcy and catch up on the lost time of their lives.

Cast

Main
 Ji Chang-wook as Ma Dong-chan (32/52)
 Won Jin-ah as Go Mi-ran (24/44)
 Yoon Se-ah as Na Ha-yeong (44)
 Chae Seo-jin as young Ha-yeong (24) Dong-chan's girlfriend

Supporting

People around Dong-chan
 Yoon Seok-hwa as Kim Won-jo, Dong-chan's mother (55/75)
 Kim Won-hae as Ma Pil-gu, Dong-chan's father (59)
 Kang Ki-doong as Ma Dong-sik (29), Dong-chan's younger brother
 Kim Won-hae as old Dong-sik (49)
 Han Da-sol as Ma Dong-joo (30), Dong-chan's younger sister
 Jeon Soo-kyeong as old Dong-joo (50)
 Lee Do-gyeom as Baek Young-tak (35), Dong-joo's ex-husband, a police detective. 
 Lee Do-yeop as old Young-tak (55)
 Lee Joo-young as Lee Hye-Jin, Dong-sik's wife 
 Oh Ah-rin as Ma Seo-yoon (7), Dong-sik's daughter

People around Mi-ran
 Gil Hae-yeon as Mi-ran's mother (46/66)
 Park Choong-sun as Mi-ran's father (45/65)
 Park Min-soo as Go Nam-tae (12)
 Yoon Na-moo as adult Nam-tae (32), Mi-ran's brother

People at the broadcast station
 Im Won-hee as Son Hyeon-gi (48)
 Lee Hong-gi as young Son Hyeon-gi (28)
Jung Hae-kyun as Kim Hong-seok (41/61)
 Han Jae-i as producer Su
 Hong Seo-baek as producer Lee

People at the campus
 Baro as Hwang Byung-shim (24), Mi-ran's ex-boyfriend
 Shim Hyung-tak as old Byung-shim (44)
 Song Ji-eun as Oh Young-seon (24) Mi-ran's best friend, who married Byung-shim
 Seo Jeong-yeon as old Young-seon (44)
 Oh Ha-nee as Park Kyung-ja (24) Mi-ran's other best friend.
 Park Hee-jin as old Kyung-ja (44)
 Choi Bo-min as Hwang Ji-hoon (19), Hwang Byung-Shim and Young-sun's son, a freshman at Korea University who develops a crush on Mi-ran.
 Kang Yoo-seok as Park Young-joon (19) Ji-hoon's best friend, a freshman at Korea University.

Others
 Lee Bong-ryun as Park Yoo-ja
 Han Ki-woong as Lee Jung-woo	
 Seo Hyun-chul as Hwang Gab-soo (46/66)
 Lee Moo-saeng as Jo Ki-beom (45)
 Kim Wook as young Ki-beom (25)
 Seo Sang-won as Doctor Yoon
 Kim Bup-rae as Lee Hyung-do/Lee Seok-do

Special appearances
 Tony Ahn (Ep. 1)
 Kim Soo-ro (Ep. 6)
 Ra Mi-ran (Ep. 6)
 Park Jin-young as Jang Woo-shin (Ep.14)

Production

Development
Won Jin-ah and Yoon Se-ah have previously starred together in Rain or Shine (2017). The first script reading took place in June 2019.

Original soundtrack

Part 1

Part 2

Part 3

Part 4

Ratings

Notes

References

External links
  
 
 

Korean-language television shows
2019 South Korean television series debuts
2019 South Korean television series endings
TVN (South Korean TV channel) television dramas
South Korean fantasy television series
Television series by Studio Dragon
Cryonics in fiction